Andeda was a town of ancient Pisidia and later of Pamphylia inhabited during Hellenistic, Roman, and Byzantine times. It was a bishopric; no longer the seat of a residential bishop, it remains a titular see of the Roman Catholic Church. It also minted coins in antiquity.

Its site is located at Yavuz, in Korkuteli, Antalya Province, Turkey.

References

Populated places in Pisidia
Populated places in ancient Pamphylia
Former populated places in Turkey
Roman towns and cities in Turkey
Catholic titular sees in Asia
History of Antalya Province
Korkuteli District